Pippi Goes on Board (original German title: Pippi geht von Bord, Swedish title: Här kommer Pippi Långstrump) is a 1969 Swedish/West German movie, based on the eponymous children's books by Astrid Lindgren with the cast of the 1969 TV series Pippi Longstocking. The film consisted of re-edited footage from the TV series. It was produced by Beta Film, one of the German co-producers of the TV series after the success of their first compilation movie Pippi Longstocking, using scenes and episodes not used in the first film. Despite its title, the film has little-to-nothing to do with the book of the same name in terms of story. The movie was eventually released in Sweden in 1973, where it has been poorly received, due to its disjointed continuity compared to the TV series. It was released in the US in 1975.

Plot
The further adventures of super-strong girl Pippi Longstocking and her friends, Tommy and Annika, in this sequel compilation film of the classic Swedish TV series.

Cast
Inger Nilsson - Pippi Longstocking
Pär Sundberg - Tommy
Maria Persson - Annika
Beppe Wolgers - Captain Efraim Longstocking
Margot Trooger - Mrs. Prysselius
Hans Clarin - Thunder-Karlsson
Paul Esser - Bloom
Ulf G. Johnsson - Kling
Göthe Grefbo - Klang
Fredrik Ohlsson - Mr. Settergren
Öllegård Wellton - Mrs. Settergren
Staffan Hallerstam - Benke

See also
Pippi Longstocking - The character
Pippi Longstocking - The 1969 TV series

References

External links
 
 

1969 films
1960s adventure comedy films
Swedish adventure comedy films
West German films
Films directed by Olle Hellbom
Films set in Sweden
Films based on Pippi Longstocking
Compilation films
Films based on television series
Swedish children's films
Films edited from television programs
1969 comedy films
1960s Swedish films